is a Japanese actor. He was born in Kanagawa Prefecture, Japan. He graduated from Meiji University.

Early life
He was born in Isogo-ku, Yokohama, Kanagawa prefecture and went to Hama Junior high school (浜中学校) and Hitorizawa High school, where it became the location for After the Rain. He graduated from Meiji University, and majored in genetic engineering. He received the "Best Poster Award" at the International Zoological Genetics Conference in 2004. While he was attending university, he worked as a bartender. He became a full-time employee there after graduation, and he became a manager later. While working as a bartender, he got into the magazine Tokyo Graffiti. A reader later recruited him to be an actor. Now, he works for Hori agency, as an actor.

Filmography

Dramas

Films

Awards

2010
 The Television Drama Academy Awards: Best Supporting Actor for GeGeGe no Nyōbō
 GQ Japan Men of the Year 2010

2011
 35th Elan d'or Awards: Best New Actor
 32nd Yokohama Film Festival: Best Newcomer for Beck and Hanamizuki
 7th TVnavi Drama of the Year 2010: Best Supporting Actor for GeGeGe no Nyōbō
 19th Hashida Awards: Best Newcomer

References

External links 
 Official profile 
 Official blog 
 Official blog on Gree 
 

1982 births
Japanese male actors
Living people
People from Kanagawa Prefecture
Meiji University alumni